Top Gear Russia was a Russian motoring television series that ran on Ren-TV, and was based on the British program Top Gear produced by the BBC. It premiered on 22 February 2009. The show was cancelled due to low ratings and aired for the last time on 25 October 2009.

Presenters
The hosts of Top Gear Russia were:
 Nikolai Fomenko, former musician (as part of the band Secret), former race car driver, theater actor and TV presenter. He is also involved in the creation of the Russian supercar Marussia.
 Mikhail Petrovsky, actor, automotive journalist and blogger.
 Oskar Kuchera, ex-MTV Russia presenter and actor.
 The Stig, a local version of the mysterious driver from the original British show.

Segments

Power Lap
Similar to the original UK series, Top Gear Russia features a Power Lap segment, in this case held in an abandoned airfield in Mnyovniki. To inaugurate the track and populate the lap board in the first episode, the hosts invited numerous local celebrities to participate and treated them to a picnic with shashlyk and a smoking samovar.

Lap times

Star in a Reasonably Priced Car
The Star in a Reasonably-Priced Car segment are mirrored with Russia's own version. The car used is a race-prepped Lada Kalina.  Unlike in the UK version of Top Gear, the lap format for this segment is different from that of the Stig's power laps.

Cool Wall
Introduced in episode 2 of season 1, the Cool Wall mirrors the popular segment from the UK original.

References

External links
'Top Gear' format heads to Russia

Russia
2000s Russian television series
2009 Russian television series debuts
2009 Russian television series endings
Russian television series based on British television series